David Stewart (born August 28, 1982) is a former American football offensive tackle in the National Football League (NFL). He played college football for Mississippi State and was drafted by the Tennessee Titans in the fourth round of the 2005 NFL Draft.

High school career
Stewart attended Lawrence County High School in Moulton, Alabama, where he was a two-way tackle and three-year letterman. He earned Class 4A all-state honors on the offensive line from the Birmingham News. Stewart also recorded 120 tackles, including 28 quarterback sacks during his junior and senior years while on defense.

He was rated with the top offensive linemen in the western half of the southeast region (Louisiana, Alabama, Mississippi, Arkansas) by Bobby Burton in his Rivals.com preseason recruiting magazine and said to have "as much potential as anyone in the state" by that publication.

College career
Stewart enrolled at Mississippi State University, where he played for the Mississippi State Bulldogs football team from 2001 to 2004.  After redshirting his initial year, Stewart appeared in six games during the 2001 season, starting vs. Louisiana State, Arkansas and Troy State. The following year, he took over the right tackle slot and went on to start the next 35 contests. He graded 82 percent for blocking consistency as a sophomore and produced 76 knockdown blocks the following season.

As a senior, Stewart graded a career-high 84.8 percent and also totaled 69 knockdowns, which earned him All-Southeastern Conference honors. In his last 35 games, Stewart recorded 218 knockdowns and had 25 touchdown-resulting blocks.

Professional career
, Stewart has made 45 consecutive starts at right tackle for the Titans, including all 16 games over the past two seasons.

He was released on March 12, 2014.

References

External links
Tennessee Titans bio

1982 births
Living people
Sportspeople from Decatur, Alabama
American football offensive tackles
Mississippi State Bulldogs football players
Tennessee Titans players
Ed Block Courage Award recipients